Tofiq Musayev (born December 15, 1989) is an Azerbaijani mixed martial artist, competing in the lightweight division of Bellator MMA. As of November 22, 2022, he is #3 in the Bellator Lightweight Rankings.

Early life 
Tofiq Musayev was born in Sahil, Azerbaijan. Even at school, due to the minimum number of sports sections, he went to karate and later with pankration, kung-fu and taekwondo. Initially having success at the regional level, Musaev decided to devote himself completely to sanda, therefore, after graduating from school in 2007, he entered the sports academy. He became Asian Pankration champion in 2016 and world champion in Kung-fu, while studying at  the Azeribaijan Sports Academy from 2007-2011. He is blue belt in Brazilian jiu-jitsu.

Mixed martial arts career

Early career
Since MMA was something new in Azerbaijan, and there were no well-trained fighters for sparring and training, Tofiq experienced certain difficulties getting used to the new format fights. Made his professional debut at the Azerbaijan MMA Federation in May 2013. When he was suddenly selected for the main event in that match, he achieved a vivid heel hold in 1R and won his debut match. His main problem was the defense on the ground, because in the first 6 fights, he filled himself with a 3-3 record, losing by submission in two cases out of three. Starting with the Ukrainian Oplot Challenge events, the athlete began to travel to Russia and perform there.

Also, he did not forget about the Motherland, where little by little, MMA tournaments began to gain popularity among the audience and his talent blossomed when he refined his fighting style, which is based on his strong punches . In 2016, Musaev made his first trip to China, where he had a couple of performances before being spotted at the WFCA. And, it is worth recognizing, with the arrival of a newcomer to the organization, the light weight had found a new potential contender.

Things were going well for Tofiq in Russia, in his debut he defeated Murad Shakhbaev, after which he went to Turkey for one fight, where he performed at the big Orion Fight Arena tournament, but then returned to the WFCA, as he planned to take the belt there. The next step for him was the meeting with Zurab Betergaraev, but the application for the status of the applicant was made in the confrontation with Marif Piraev.

Having sent him to a technical knockout already in the first round, Musaev waited for proposals from the promotion, but they never came. Not wanting to wait for the leadership's decision on the fight with the champion, the Azerbaijani responded to the call of another league, very famous in Japan - RIZIN Fighting Federation to sign him for their New Year's Eve event for 2018.

RIZIN Fighting Federation
Musayev made his RIZIN debut at Rizin 14 against Nobumitsu Osawa as the opening bout of the night. He won by TKO in the 2nd round, using ground and pound to finish the bout.

He was scheduled to face 13-fight UFC veteran and TUF: Live Team Faber contestant Daron Cruickshank at Rizin 16. He won by unanimous decision.

Lightweight Grand Prix
RIZIN announced that they would be hosting a Lightweight Grand Prix from September. Tofiq was 1 of 8 participants announced. On September 20, 2019, Tofiq was drawn against former XFC & Brace Lightweight champion and 6-fight UFC veteran Damien Brown at Rizin 19 as the quarterfinal match. He won by TKO in the final minute of the first round, using a head kick and punches to score the stoppage.

At RIZIN.20, Musayev took on former MCC Lightweight champion and 6-fight UFC veteran Johnny Case in the semi-finals. Musayev dropped Case early in the 1st round and follwed up with strikes to force referee to intervene. In the finals, he met Bellator Lightweight title challenger Patricky Freire. An exciting back-and-forth battle ended in a unanimous decision victory for the underdog Musaev (despite breaking his hand in the second round), and the Lightweight Grand Prix belt. His performance earned him widespread attention from his home country as the Deputy Minister of Youth and Sports, Ismail Ismayilov to congratulate him, as well as the global MMA audience as he was considered one of the best lightweights outside of the UFC (Fight Matrix ranked him #13 globally and the best outside the UFC).

After his Grand Prix triumph, Musayev was approached by the UFC, but declined an offer as he waited for RIZIN to make a proposal. “We were approached from the UFC, made a concrete proposal. But at the moment we are waiting for a response from Rizin. If we are satisfied with their proposal, then we will remain in this organization and will defend the title. Otherwise, I go to the UFC.” Musayev confirmed in March 2020 that he will sign a new contract with RIZIN, despite offers from both the UFC and ONE. He stated "[RIZIN] respect[s] their fighters and try to give them everything so that they stay with them.”

In September 2020, Musayev was called to join the army in light of the 2020 Nagorno-Karabakh war. He is a reserve lieutenant of the Ground Forces of the Azerbaijan Armed Forces, taking an active part in the front line from the first days of the war. The conflict ended in November after roughly 1 month of conflict and an Azerbaijani victory.

As the Covid-19 pandemic ensued and borders were shut, Musayev could not participate in RIZIN for the whole of 2020, and the first half of 2021. Fellow RIZIN lightweight, Roberto de Souza stated ahead of RIZIN.27 that the promotion should crown a new champion if Musayev cannot return.

On June 1, 2021, it was announced that Tofiq will face Roberto de Souza on June 13, 2021 at Rizin 28 for the inaugural Rizin FF Lightweight Championship. after a 14-day quarantine period from entry due to measures against the spread of the new coronavirus infection, he faced Roberto de Souza and suffered a first round loss due to a triangle choke.

Bellator MMA 
On January 10, 2022, it was announced that Musayev signed a multi-fight contract with Bellator MMA.

Musayev was scheduled to make his Bellator debut on April 22, 2022 at Bellator 278 against Zach Zane. However, the bout was scrapped after Zane pulled out due to unknown reasons and Tofiq wasn't rebooked against a new opponent.

Musayev was scheduled to face Adam Piccolotti on July 22, 2022 at Bellator 283. Piccolotti however pulled out of the bout due to injury. Musayev was instead rebooked against Sidney Outlaw, after his opponent pulled out of their bout, and won the match via knockout 27 seconds into the first round.

Lightweight Grand Prix 
On January 11, 2023, Musayev was announced as one of the 8 participants in the $1 million Lightweight Grand Prix, with his quarterfinal bout against Alexandr Shabliy taking place on March 10, 2023 at Bellator 292. Musayev lost the bout in the third round, with a body kick rendering him unable to continue.

Championships and achievements

Mixed martial arts
Rizin Fighting Federation
RIZIN Lightweight Grand Prix Champion

Mixed martial arts record

|-
|Loss
|align=center|20–5
|Alexandr Shabliy
|TKO (body kick)
|Bellator 292
|
|align=center|3
|align=center|0:29
|San Jose, California, United States
|
|-
|Win
|align=center|20–4
|Sidney Outlaw
|KO (punches)
|Bellator 283
|
|align=center|1
|align=center|0:27
|Tacoma, Washington, United States
|
|-
|Loss
|align=center|19–4
|Roberto de Souza
|Submission (triangle choke)
|Rizin 28
|
|align=center|1
|align=center|1:12
|Tokyo, Japan
|
|-
|Win
|align=center|19–3
|Patricky Pitbull
|Decision (unanimous)
|rowspan=2 |Rizin 20
|rowspan=2 |
|align=center|3
|align=center|5:00
|rowspan=2 |Saitama, Japan
|
|-
|Win
|align=center|18–3
|Johnny Case
|TKO (punches)
|align=center|1
|align=center|2:47
|
|-
|Win
|align=center|17–3
|Damien Brown
|TKO (head kick and punches)
|Rizin 19
|
|align=center|1
|align=center|4:14
|Osaka, Japan
|
|-
|Win
|align=center|16–3
|Daron Cruickshank
|Decision (unanimous)
|Rizin 16
|
|align=center|3
|align=center|5:00
|Kobe, Japan
|
|-
|Win
|align=center|15–3
|Nobumitsu Osawa
|TKO (punches)
|Rizin 14
|
|align=center|2
|align=center|1:19
|Saitama, Japan
|
|-
|Win
|align=center|14–3
|Marif Piraev
|TKO (punches)
|WFCA 48: Zhamaldaev vs. Khasbulaev 2
|
|align=center|1
|align=center|3:24
|Baku, Azerbaijan
|
|-
|Win
|align=center|13–3
|Zurab Betergaraev
|TKO (injury)
|WFCA 45: Grozny Battle
|
|align=center| 2
|align=center| 1:23
|Grozny, Russia
|
|-
|Win
|align=center|12–3
|Murat Kocaturk
|TKO (punches)
|Orion Fight Arena: Spectacular Kickboxing MMA Gala
|
|align=center|2
|align=center|2:50
|Ankara, Turkey
|
|-
|Win
|align=center|11–3
|Murad Shakhbanov
|TKO (punches)
|WFCA 34: Battle in Moscow
|
|align=center| 3
|align=center| 2:16
|Moscow, Russia
|
|-
|Win
|align=center|10–3
|Ayub Fahimi
|KO (punches)
|Azerbaijan MMA Federation: Azerbaijan vs. Iran
|
|align=center| 1
|align=center| 3:56
|Baku, Azerbaijan
|
|-
|Win
|align=center|9–3
|Ooi Aik Tong
|TKO (punches)
|rowspan=2|Chinese Wushu Fight League
|rowspan=2|
|align=center|1
|align=center|1:35
|rowspan=2|Guangzhou, China
|
|-
|Win
|align=center|8–3
|Jiang Tao
|TKO (punches)
|align=center|1
|align=center|3:52
|
|-
|Win
|align=center|7–3
|Yincang Bao
|TKO (punches)
|International Kungfu Championship: Matan Tesco Cup
|
|align=center|1
|align=center|3:55
|Jiangsu, China
|
|-
|Win
|align=center|6–3
|Shamil Magomedzagidov
|KO (punch)
|Azerbaijan MMA Federation: National Open Cup
|
|align=center|1
|align=center|3:42
|Baku, Azerbaijan
|
|-
|Win
|align=center|5–3
|Magomed Alkuliev
|KO (punch)
|Selection Of Warriors 3
|
|align=center|1
|align=center|2:53
|Makhachkala, Russia
|
|-
|Loss
|align=center|4–3
|Aigun Akhmedov
|Decision (unanimous)
|New Stream: Russia vs. The World
|
|align=center|2
|align=center|5:00
|Moscow, Russia
|
|-
|Win
|align=center|4–2
|Said Khalilov
|TKO (punches)
|MMA Star In The Ring 2
|
|align=center|1
|align=center|3:33
|Makhachkala, Russia
|
|-
|Loss
|align=center|3–2
|Evgeny Lakhin
|Submission (triangle choke)
|Siberian League: Combat Kuzbass 1
|
|align=center|1
|align=center|1:12
|Kemerovo, Russia
|
|-
|Win
|align=center| 3–1
|Musulman Muslimov
|TKO (punches)
|MMA Star in the Ring 1
|
|align=center|1
|align=center|N/A 
|Makhachkala, Russia
|
|-
|Loss
|align=center|2–1
|Mukhamed Berkhamov
|Submission (anaconda choke)
|Oplot Challenge 90
|
|align=center|1
|align=center|4:09
|Kharkov, Ukraine
|
|-
|Win
|align=center|2–0
|Emilbek Beknazarov
|Submission (rear-naked choke)
|Oplot Challenge 80
|
|align=center|1
|align=center|3:26
|Kharkov, Ukraine
|
|-
|Win
|align=center|1–0
|Yavuz Selim Kazanci
|Submission (heel hook)
|Azerbaijan MMA Federation: Azerbaijan vs. Turkey
|
|align=center|1
|align=center|2:33
|Baku, Azerbaijan
|
|-

See also 
 List of current Bellator MMA fighters
 List of male mixed martial artists

References

External links 
  
  

1989 births
Living people
Azerbaijani male mixed martial artists
Lightweight mixed martial artists
Mixed martial artists utilizing sanshou
Mixed martial artists utilizing pankration
Mixed martial artists utilizing Brazilian jiu-jitsu
Bellator male fighters
Azerbaijani sanshou practitioners
Azerbaijani practitioners of Brazilian jiu-jitsu